CBA is a Hungarian supermarket chain with almost 5,200 stores. It operates in Bulgaria, Lithuania, Czech Republic, Croatia, Hungary, Poland, Romania, Serbia and Slovakia.

There were 134 stores in Bulgaria in February 2018.

Most CBA stores have grill bars, bakeries, butcher's and wine shops. A discount store is also available (BA Cent) and a hypermarket (Príma).

History 
In 1992, CBA was formed of 17 grocery stores from 10 private owners in Budapest. Stores elsewhere in the country were only opened years later. In 1998, 80% of stores outside Budapest were CBA stores. Because of difficulties with delivering, CBA opened regional headquarters. In 2005, CBA opened its first logistic center in Alsónémedi. From that year, CBA became a franchise system.

Kasszás Erzsi and Icuka 
During 2017, CBA released a commercial in Hungary featuring Kasszás Erzsi (Cashier Erzsi) (played by Andrea Balázs), a woman who works as a cashier. In the commercial, Erzsi sang about working in CBA. She appeared in every commercial until 2018 and became so famous that CBA  made a tour with her around the country. Fans could meet Erzsi in selected CBA stores. In 2018, Erzsi was replaced by Icuka, a shop manager (Szilvia Bach) who sings in rap.

References

External links 
 CBA Hungary 
 Príma Hungary (in Hungarian)
 CBA NORDVEST Romania  
 CBA Poland (Nasz Sklep)  
 CBA Bulgaria 
NTL Croatia 
 CBA Slovakia 
 CBA Czech Republic (in Czech)
 Company profile at IGD Retail Analysis

Supermarkets of Hungary
Retail companies of Hungary
Supermarkets of Bulgaria
Supermarkets of Croatia
Supermarkets of Poland
Supermarkets of Romania
Supermarkets of Slovenia
Supermarkets of Serbia
Hungarian brands
Convenience stores
Retail companies established in 1992
Food retailers
Hungarian companies established in 1992